George W. Clarke (June 22, 1906 – June 25, 2006) was an American politician in the state of Washington.

He was born in Perry, Iowa, on June 22, 1906. Clarke and his family moved to Mercer Island, Washington when he was young. Clarke received his bachelor's degree from University of Washington and his law degree from University of Washington School of Law. He then practiced law. 
He served in the Washington House of Representatives from 1967 to 1971 and then in the Washington State Senate from 1971 to 1985 as a Republican. He died three days after his 100th birthday on June 25, 2006.

References

1906 births
2006 deaths
American centenarians
Men centenarians
People from Franklin County, Iowa
People from Mercer Island, Washington
University of Washington alumni
University of Washington School of Law alumni
Washington (state) lawyers
Republican Party Washington (state) state senators
Republican Party members of the Washington House of Representatives
20th-century American politicians
20th-century American lawyers